Ed Marion (1927, Charlotte, North Carolina – 28 April 2008) was an American official in the National Football League. Marion was in the league from 1960 to 1987 and officiated in Super Bowl V, IX and XI. He wore the number 26 for the majority of his career (during the 1979–81 period, he wore number 6).

Marion grew up in Harrisburg, Pennsylvania and served in the U.S. Navy during WW II.  Marion graduated from the University of Pennsylvania in 1950, where he played football. He worked in the pension and insurance industry for 46 years.

Marion died on 28 April 2008.

References

1927 births
2008 deaths
National Football League officials
University of Pennsylvania alumni
Sportspeople from Harrisburg, Pennsylvania
Penn Quakers football players
Date of birth missing
Sportspeople from Charlotte, North Carolina
United States Navy personnel of World War II